The 2021–22 Canisius Golden Griffins men's basketball team represented Canisius College in the 2021–22 NCAA Division I men's basketball season. The Golden Griffins, led by sixth-year head coach Reggie Witherspoon, played their home games at the Koessler Athletic Center in Buffalo, New York as members of the Metro Atlantic Athletic Conference.

Previous season
The Golden Griffins finished the 2020–21 season 7–6, 7–5 in MAAC play to finish in a tie for fifth place. As the No. 6 seed in the MAAC tournament, they were upset in the first round by No. 11 seed Rider.

Roster

Schedule and results

|-
!colspan=12 style=""| Exhibition

|-
!colspan=12 style=""| Regular season

|-
!colspan=9 style=""| MAAC tournament

Sources

References

Canisius Golden Griffins men's basketball seasons
Canisius Golden Griffins
Canisius Golden Griffins men's basketball
Canisius Golden Griffins men's basketball